Trithemis monardi is a species of dragonfly in the family Libellulidae. It is found in Angola, Benin, Botswana, Burkina Faso, Cameroon, Central African Republic, the Democratic Republic of the Congo, Ivory Coast, Ethiopia, Gabon, Gambia, Ghana, Kenya, Malawi, Mali, Mozambique, Namibia, Nigeria, Sierra Leone, Uganda, Zambia, and Zimbabwe. Its natural habitats are subtropical or tropical moist lowland forests, subtropical or tropical dry shrubland, subtropical or tropical moist shrubland, rivers, swamps, freshwater marshes, and intermittent freshwater marshes.

References

monardi
Taxonomy articles created by Polbot
Insects described in 1931